Edwin Ignacio Jubahib is a Filipino politician serving as  governor of Davao del Norte since 2019. He was also the personal assistant of congressman and former speaker Pantaleon Alvarez.

Early life
Jubahib was born to an indigent family of farmers in Barangay New Visayas, Panabo, Davao (now Davao del Norte). He studied at New Visayas Elementary School and Panabo Provincial High School while supplementing his family's income through farmwork, selling vegetables, and other odd jobs. He earned his Bachelor of Science degree in criminology from the University of Mindanao in nearby Davao City. He then worked for a bus company starting as a conductor and was promoted to inspector, and later assistant operations manager. In 2004, he went to Japan after securing an apprenticeship in technical engineering. Upon his return to the Philippines, he started his construction company.

Political career
In 2010, Jubahib served as regional campaign manager of Senator Manny Villar's presidential campaign. During that time, he met and befriended politician Pantaleon Alvarez. He then worked as Alvarez's personal assistant.

In 2018, Congressman Alvarez and PDP–Laban fielded Jubahib as their gubernatorial candidate for the 2019 elections. Jubahib defeated Rodolfo "Rodney" del Rosario Jr., ending the Del Rosario political dynasty's 40-year rule in Davao del Norte.

Electoral history

References

Living people
People from Davao del Norte
Governors of Davao del Norte
PDP–Laban politicians
Year of birth missing (living people)